Église Saint-Blaise de Calenzana is a church in Calenzana, Haute-Corse, Corsica. The building was classified as a Historic Monument in 1981.

References

Churches in Corsica
Monuments historiques of Corsica
Buildings and structures in Haute-Corse